AS Lero is an Timorese football club from Lautém District. The team plays in the Liga Futebol Amadora Terceira Divisão.

Competition records

Liga Futebol Amadora 
LFA Terceira 2019: 3nd places in Groub B

References

Football clubs in East Timor
Football
Lautém Municipality